Lajos Kiss (6 June 1940 – 21 January 2009) was a Hungarian rower. He competed in the men's coxless four event at the 1960 Summer Olympics.

References

1940 births
2009 deaths
Hungarian male rowers
Olympic rowers of Hungary
Rowers at the 1960 Summer Olympics
Rowers from Budapest